The Bridge at Villeneuve-la-Garenne is an 1872 painting by Alfred Sisley, now in the Metropolitan Museum of Art in New York City.

Provenance
It was bought from the artist on 24 August 1872 by Durand-Ruel, who sold it to Jean-Baptiste Faure on 15 April 1873. It was passed on to his son Louis Maurice's wife, who sold it to Georges Petit and Durand-Ruel in 1919. It was passed through various art dealers before being acquired by Fernand Bouisson sometime before 1930. It was then sold in New York and had been acquired by 1957 by Henry Ittleson Junior and his wife, who donated it to its present owner in 1964.

References

Paintings by Alfred Sisley
1872 paintings
Paintings in the collection of the Metropolitan Museum of Art
Bridges in art
Ships in art